The Sounds of Australia, formerly the National Registry of Recorded Sound, is the National Film and Sound Archive's selection of sound recordings which are deemed to have cultural, historical and aesthetic significance and relevance for Australia. It was founded in 2007.

History
The National Registry of Recorded Sound was established in 2007 by the National Film and Sound Archive, to encourage appreciation of the diversity of sounds recorded in Australia, ever since the first phonographs made by the US Edison Manufacturing Company were available in Australia in the mid-1890s.

The earliest recording in the archive is "The Hen Convention", a song recorded some time before 15 January 1897, by an amateur sound recordist called Thomas Rome, of Warrnambool, Victoria, who imported the most modern equipment available from the USA. The song features the voice of John James Villiers, also of Warrnambool. It is a novelty song, featuring imitations of sounds made by chickens.

Other early sound recordings include Aboriginal Tasmanian women's songs (1899), Spencer and Gillen's 1901 recordings on wax cylinder of Arrernte, Anmatyerr, Kaytetye, Warumungu, Luritja and Arabana peoples of central Australia (added in 2019), and Ernest Shackleton talking about his polar expedition in 1910.

Description
As part of the National Film and Sound Archive (NFSA), it is part of a "living archive", to share in many ways and to keep for future generations.

Each year, the Australian public nominates new sounds to be added with final selections determined by a panel of industry experts and NFSA curators. There are usually about ten recordings added each year. The recordings represent significant achievements in the way we have recorded the sounds of our history and memory.

The criteria for nomination are wide: "they can be popular songs, advertising jingles, famous speeches, radio broadcasts, or any other sound recordings" – but they must be Australian, and they must be more than 10 years old.

Recordings
In this table, "2007a" refers to the 2007 Foundation List (entries chosen before official voting began), while "2007b" refers to the first of the annual registry additions, also in 2007.

 Notes

Statistics
The most recent recording on the list is former prime minister Julia Gillard's Misogyny Speech, while the oldest is Percy Herford's 1896 recording "The Hen Convention".

See also
National Recording Registry
Culture of Australia

References

External links

 
2007 establishments in Australia
Australia history-related lists
Australian music awards
Awards established in 2007
Australian music-related lists
Reference material lists